Good Morning Aztlán is a studio album by the American band Los Lobos, released in 2002.  It was reissued in 2004 (Mobile Fidelity SACD reissue).

Track listing

Note
 The original 2002 Mammoth Records issue came with a second CD containing two previously unreleased live recordings. It also included a documentary by Anastasia Simone and Ian Spencer about the making of the album.

Personnel

Los Lobos 
 David Hidalgo – guitar, vocals, bass, keyboards, requinto jarocho, melodica, drums
 Cesar Rosas – guitar, vocals, quatro
 Conrad Lozano – bass, vocals
 Louie Pérez – guitar, jarana, drums, percussion 
 Steve Berlin – saxophone, flutes, MIDIsaxophone, keyboards, percussion

Additional musicians
 Pete Thomas – drums (1, 2, 4, 5)
 Cougar Estrada – drums (3, 7, 9, 10), percussion (7, 9, 10, 12)
 Rick Marotta – drums (6)
 Victor Bisetti – percussion (7, 8, 9, 10)
 Bucky Baxter – pedal steel guitar (1, 5, 8) 
 Martha Gonzalez – background vocals (2, 8, 10, 12) 
 Fermin Herrera – Veracruz harp (7)

Production
 Los Lobos – producer (all tracks) 
 John Leckie – producer (all tracks, except 4, 8, 10), engineer, mixing    
 Dave McNair – engineer, mixing
 Seth McLain – assistant engineer
 Kevin Dean – assistant engineer, mixing assistant
 Steven Rhodes – mixing assistant
 Bob Shaper – engineer, mixing (bonus CD)
 Robert Hadley – mastering
 Louie Perez – art direction
 Al Quattrocchi – art direction
 Jeff Smith – art direction
 Toronto Design, Los Angeles – design
 Sandow Birk – cover printing 
 Mark Van S – photography

References

Los Lobos albums
2002 albums
Albums produced by John Leckie
Mammoth Records albums